The Muhajirin wa-Ansar Alliance (Alliance of Emigrants and Helpers) is an alliance of Salafi jihadist groups that have been active during the Syrian Civil War.   The groups involved are: Jund al-Aqsa (former), Liwaa al-Umma, the Omar Brigade and the Haqq Brigade in Idlib. Two prominent members of the alliance, Jund al-Aqsa and Haqq Brigade in Idlib, became part of the Army of Conquest operations room in 2015, entering into a strategic relationship with al-Nusra Front. Jund al-Aqsa later left the Army of Conquest.

See also
List of armed groups in the Syrian Civil War

References

Anti-government factions of the Syrian civil war